In enzymology, a formimidoylglutamate deiminase is an enzyme that catalyzes the chemical reaction

N-formimidoyl-L-glutamate + H2O  N-formyl-L-glutamate + NH3

Thus, the two substrates of this enzyme are N-formimidoyl-L-glutamate and H2O, whereas its two products are N-formyl-L-glutamate and NH3.

This enzyme belongs to the family of hydrolases, those acting on carbon-nitrogen bonds other than peptide bonds, specifically in linear amidines.  The systematic name of this enzyme class is N-formimidoyl-L-glutamate iminohydrolase. Other names in common use include formiminoglutamate deiminase, and formiminoglutamic iminohydrolase.  This enzyme participates in histidine metabolism.

References

 

EC 3.5.3
Enzymes of unknown structure